There are at least 52 named lakes and reservoirs in Blaine County, Montana.

Lakes
 Alkali Lake, el. 
 Bigby Lake, el. 
 Duck Lake, el. 
 Fifteen Mile Lake, el. 
 Hornbeck Lake, el. 
 J Lake, el. 
 Lake Seventeen, el. 
 Martin Lake, el. 
 Mud Lake, el. 
 Old Woman Lake, el. 
 Ross Lake, el. 
 Silver Bow Lake, el. 
 Skinners Lake, el.

Reservoirs
 Als Coulee Reservoir, el. 
 Anderson Reservoir, el. 
 Black Coulee, el. 
 Blanch Reservoir, el. 
 Brush Shack Reservoir, el. 
 Bud Reservoir, el. 
 Butch Reservoir, el. 
 Dalberg Reservoir, el. 
 Down Reservoir, el. 
 Faber Reservoir, el. 
 Four O'Clock Reservoir, el. 
 Grasshopper Reservoir, el. 
 Harbolt Reservoir, el. 
 Holm Reservoir, el. 
 J Lake, el. 
 Juniper Reservoir, el. 
 Lower Hansen Reservoir, el. 
 McLaren Reservoir, el. 
 Newhouse Reservoir, el. 
 Nolan Reservoir, el. 
 North Chinook Reservoir, el. 
 Old Woman Reservoir, el. 
 Putnam Lake, el. 
 Richmond Reservoir, el. 
 Rieve Reservoir, el. 
 Sandpiper Reservoir, el. 
 Seventeen Mile Reservoir, el. 
 Staff Reservoir, el. 
 Suction Creek Reservoir, el. 
 T U Reservoir, el. 
 Thirtymile Reservoir, el. 
 Threemile Reservoir, el. 
 Tule Lake, el. 
 Twin Reservoir, el. 
 Upper Hansen Reservoir, el. 
 Weigand Reservoir, el. 
 Weigand Reservoir, el. 
 White Bear Reservoir, el. 
 Wren Reservoir, el.

See also
 List of lakes in Montana

Notes

Bodies of water of Blaine County, Montana
Blaine